The men's 4 × 400 metres relay event at the 1999 All-Africa Games was held 17–18 September 1999 at the Johannesburg Stadium.

Results

Heats
Qualification: First 3 teams of each heat (Q) plus the next 2 fastest (q) qualified for the final.

Final

References

4 x 400